The Ford River is a perennial river of the Corangamite catchment, located in the Otways region of the Australian state of Victoria.

Location and features
The headwaters of the Ford River rise in the Otway Ranges in southwest Victoria, near , and flows generally east by south through the Port Campbell National Park towards the town of Glenaire where the river heads east and reaches its confluence with the Aire River, northwest of Cape Otway. From its highest point, the river descends  over its  course.

See also

References

External links

Corangamite catchment
Rivers of Barwon South West (region)
Otway Ranges